Drumragh Integrated College is an integrated mixed-religion, non-selective secondary school for girls and boys aged from 11 to 18, located at 70 Crevenagh Road, Omagh, County Tyrone, Northern Ireland.

Context
Integrated Education is a Northern Ireland phenomenum, where traditionally schools were sectarian, either run as Catholic schools or Protestant schools. On a parental request, a school could apply to 'transition' to become Grant Maintained offering 30% of the school places to students from the minority community. Lagan College was the first integrated school to open in 1981.

Description
The school had 580 pupils in 2018, with approval to expand to 645 pupils and is within the Western Education and Library Board area. Although mixed-religion, Drumragh College teaches with a Christian ethos. Drumragh College received funding of 20 million pounds for new school facilities in 2001 while it was located at the side of the old Tyrone and Fermanagh Hospital. The new modern school started construction in 2007 and was finished in 2009. A plan to expand the school's size Area for more pupils to attend the school was proposed in September 2012 but it was refused by the Minister Of Education.

Staff
Drumragh Integrated College's previous principal was Nigel Frith, who is yet to be replaced. Preceding him were Maria Gillespie (acting principal), Lady Rosemary Salisbury and Dr. Kathleen Hynes (the first principal of the school). Mr. I. Booth is the Chairman of the school's Board of Governors.

Notable former pupils

Janet Devlin: song artist who came 5th in the X-factor in 2011.

See also
 List of integrated schools in Northern Ireland
 List of secondary schools in Northern Ireland
 Education in Northern Ireland

References

External links
 Official school website
  Aerial Photo- shortly after completion of construction- Gordon Dunn
 NICIE website

Secondary schools in County Tyrone
Integrated schools in County Tyrone